Manhattan is a large scale mural by the German artist and colorist Josef Albers. The mural was first installed in New York City's MetLife Building, originally the Pan Am Building. Removed in 2001 during renovations of the building's lobby, the mural was rebuilt in 2019 according to Albers' original specifications. It is now installed in the lobby of the MetLife Building, and placed backwards at the summit of the escalators of the modernist skyscraper and Grand Central Terminal's Main Concourse.
The original work was laden with asbestos.

History
In 1929 Albers, then at The Bauhaus in Germany, created a work called "City". Years later in the early 1960s after having emigrated to the United States and settling in New York City  the architect and founder of the Bauhaus Walter Gropius commissioned him to do a mural for the then new Pan Am Building (now MetLife building) at 200 Park Avenue.  Subsequently, he worked his original design into the formidably sized "Manhattan". As Nicholas Fox Weber, Executive Director of the Josef and Anni Albers Foundation, explained: "In making the mural, he took a concept he had developed at the Bauhaus in sandblasted glass, and gave it new life on a vastly large scale to serve the purposes of his friend and colleague, Walter Gropius, who designed the original building and asked him to make the mural."

In 2001 the mural was taken down while the MetLife lobby was under renovation. Therein some years earlier ownership of the structure had changed hands and moniker to MetLife and the new owner's citing repurposing of the lobby to allow for more light to enter doubled with the fact the mural had been found to be laden with asbestos took the work down without notice. This then led to somewhat of an uproar.

In 2019 the new owners of the structure Tishman Speyer decided to reinstall the work in its original position. However, as the murals was disassembled into panels which were laden with asbestos, the work had to be recreated. Albers had left behind precise specifications that allowed for the work to be recreated. The installation was completed in September 2019.

References

Bauhaus
Murals in New York City
Public art in New York City
Grand Central Terminal
1963 in art
2019 in art
1963 establishments in New York City
1963 in New York City
2019 establishments in New York City
2010s in Manhattan
1963 works